is a railway station located in the town of  Naraha, Fukushima Prefecture, Japan, operated by the East Japan Railway Company (JR East).

Lines
Kido Station is served by the Jōban Line, and is located 237.8 km from the official starting point of the line at Nippori Station.

Station layout
The station has two opposed side platforms connected by a footbridge. The station is unattended.

Platforms

History
Kido Station opened on August 23, 1898. The station was absorbed into the JR East network upon the privatization of the Japanese National Railways (JNR) on April 1, 1987.

Due to the Fukushima Daiichi nuclear disaster in 2011, operations were halted. Operations south of the station were resumed on June 1, 2014.

Surrounding area
Tatsuta is within the evacuation zone surrounding the Fukushima Daiichi Nuclear Power Plant. Since August 2012 it has been possible to enter the area, but remaining in the area overnight is prohibited.
Road Station Naraha
Kido Post Office

Hirono Power Station

References

External links
 
 Station information JR East Station Information 

Railway stations in Fukushima Prefecture
Jōban Line
Railway stations in Japan opened in 1898
Stations of East Japan Railway Company
Naraha, Fukushima